Nils Zumbeel (born January 19, 1990) is a German footballer who plays for VfV 06 Hildesheim.

References

External links

Nils Zumbeel at FuPa

1990 births
Living people
People from Meppen
German footballers
Association football goalkeepers
VfL Osnabrück players
3. Liga players
Footballers from Lower Saxony
VfV 06 Hildesheim players